Gkuthaarn,  also rendered Kuthant,  Kutanda and other variant spellings, is an extinct Paman language of the Cape York Peninsula, Queensland, Australia. It also known as Karundi/Garandi (and variant spellings), but the Garandi language may be a separate dialect.

Norman Tindale also assigned the name Kareldi, but this is not confirmed by others. Current sources refer to the Gkuthaarn people.

Alternative names
Tindale
Kotanda, also spelt Kutanda, Goothanto
Karundi, also spelt Karunti, Kurandi, Ka-rantee, Karrandi, Karrandee, Gar-und-yih, thought to be derived from Karun-/Gooran, meaning scrublands people.

However, according to Lauriston Sharp, Kotanda was also used for the now extinct Kalibamu, and Karandi/Garandi (AUSTLANG G32) was a different local group, and AIATSIS agrees.

Other variants
Other variant spellings included in AUSTLANG are:
Karaldi
Gudanda
Gudhanda
Gudhand
Guandhar

Phonology

Consonants 

[ʈ] is attested only in the sequence [ɳʈ] and in Kukatj loans.

Vowels 

Kuthant has two diphthongs: /ia/ and /ua/.

Some words
According to W.E. Armit, inspector of Native Police, these were some words of the "Karrandee tribe":
 irruag (tame dog)
 nyet (father)
 mooruk (mother)
 morbuy (whiteman)

References

Further reading 
  (Also here.)

Paman languages
Extinct languages of Queensland